Angelina Wilhelmina Karamoy, known as Angel Karamoy (born January 16, 1987) is an Indonesian actress and singer. She began her debut soap opera with played for Saras 008 in Indosiar. She is the oldest sister of former girlband member Cherrybelle, Kezia Karamoy, and the youngest sister of Daniel Karamoy, who is in the member band for SAGA.

Career
She began her career as an actress in TV commercials. She has since worked in soap operas, such as Kala Cinta Menggoda, Pelangi Di Matamu 2, Mukjizat Itu Nyata, Kurindu Jiwaku and many others. Her name became known when she took Marshanda's role as Lala on Bidadari 3. She released the spiritual album Mukjizat Itu Nyata.

Angel appointed as guest star in Opera Van Java in 2013 to 2014. During Ramadhan, she played the role as household assistant in Ini Sahur on NET.

Personal life
Angelina Wilhelmina Karamoy was born on January 16, 1987, in Manado, North Sulawesi, to Vence J. Karamoy and Theresia. She is a graduate of Yadika 5 Senior High. She married Steven McJames Rumangkang on January 26, 2008, at the Jakarta Convention Center. They have two children. In July 2016, Angel officially divorced to her husband.

Filmography

Soap operas
 Saras 008 (English: "Saras 008")
 Pelangi Di Matamu 2 (English: "Rainbow in Your Eyes 2")
 Hati Di Pucuk Pelangi (English: "Heart At the Top Of the Rainbow")
 Ada Apa Dengan Pelangi (English: "What Happen with Pelangi")
 ABC&D (English: "ABC&D")
 Daun Daun Kering (English: "Dry Leaves")
 Biar Cinta Bicara (English: "Let The Heart Talk")
 Bidadari 3 (English: "Angel 3")
 Anak Pungut (English: "Adoptee")
 Kala Cinta Menggoda (English: "When Love Starts Teasing")
 Kurindu Jiwaku (English: "I Miss My Soul")
 Dunia Belum Kiamat (English: "The World Is Not Doom")
 Seleb I'm In Love (English: "Celeb I'm In Love")
 Maha Cinta (English: "Infinite Love")
 Mukjizat Itu Nyata (English: "The Real Miracle")
 Hidayah episode Bawang Putih Tiri (English: "Guidance" episode Garlic Step)
 Dibalik Jilbab Zaskia (English: "Behind Zaskia's Veil")
 Terdampar (English: "Stranded")
 Berbagi Cinta (English: "Sharing Love")
 Ibrahim Anak Betawi (English: "Ibrahim The Betawi Child")
 Bara Bere (English: "Bara Bere")
 Emak Ijah Pengen Ke Mekah (English: "Emak Ijah Wants To Go To Mecca")
 Cowokku Superboy (English: "My Guy Superboy")
 Gue Juga Islam (English: "I Am Also Islam")
 Surga Yang Kedua (English: The Second Heaven)

Television series
 Masalembo (2015)

Comedy shows
 Opera Van Java (Trans 7; 2013–2014)
 Ini Sahur (NET.; 2014)

Discography
 Dignity
 Mujizat Itu Nyata

References

External links
 
 Beritanya di detikhot.com
 Beritanya di jawapos.com
 Beritanya di sctv.co.id
 Beritanya di astaga.com
 Beritanya di hai-online.com
 Beritanya di kafegaul.com
 Beritanya di surya.co.id

1987 births
21st-century Indonesian actresses
Indonesian Christians
Indonesian Protestants
People from Manado
Minahasa people
21st-century Indonesian women singers
Living people
Actresses from North Sulawesi